Makkin Salih (1923 – 24 May 2003) was a cricketer who played first-class cricket for Ceylon from 1947 to 1955.

An opening batsman for the Moors Sports Club in Colombo, Makkin Salih made his first-class debut for Ceylon Cricket Association against Southern India in 1946–47, scoring 98 and sharing century partnerships with Fredrick de Saram and Mahadevan Sathasivam. He toured Pakistan in 1949-50 with the Ceylon team.

He set a batting record for Sara Trophy matches when he scored 237 for Moors in 1952. The record stood until 1970, when A. C. M. Lafir scored 255 for Nomads Sports Club.

He and his wife Sithy Suada (the sister of the Ceylon cricketer Abu Fuard) had four children.

References

External links

1923 births
2003 deaths
Sri Lankan cricketers
All-Ceylon cricketers
Alumni of Saint Joseph's College, Colombo
Moors Sports Club cricketers